Li Zhuhao (born January 9, 1999) is a Chinese competitive swimmer, specializing in butterfly. At the 2014 Asian Games, he won the silver medal in the 100 metre butterfly and the gold medal in the 4 × 100 m medley relay, setting the Asian Games record.

In August 2015, Li competed in the World Championships in Kazan, Russia. In the semifinals of the 100 meter butterfly he broke the junior world record with a time of 51.33. He finished 8th in the final.
A month later in Huangshan, Li broke the junior world record in the 200 meter butterfly (again in long course) with a time of 1:55.52.

On August 13, Li finished 5th in the finals of the 100 m butterfly at the Olympic Games in Rio.

Personal bests (long course)

References

External links

Li Zhuhao's Weibo

 
 

Living people
1999 births
Sportspeople from Wenzhou
Swimmers from Zhejiang
Male butterfly swimmers
Olympic swimmers of China
Swimmers at the 2016 Summer Olympics
Asian Games medalists in swimming
Swimmers at the 2014 Asian Games
Swimmers at the 2018 Asian Games
Swimmers at the 2014 Summer Youth Olympics
Asian Games gold medalists for China
Asian Games silver medalists for China
Asian Games bronze medalists for China
World Aquatics Championships medalists in swimming
Medalists at the 2014 Asian Games
Medalists at the 2018 Asian Games
Youth Olympic gold medalists for China
21st-century Chinese people